Ygre is a village in the municipality of Voss in Vestland county, Norway.

County Road 308 branches off to the north at Ygre to the villages of Nedra Kyte, Nordheim (also known as Norheim), and Øvre Kyte.

References

External links
Ygre at Norgeskart

Voss
Villages in Vestland